Charles Edward Wicks (July 9, 1925 — July 29, 2010) was an American chemical engineer.  He was a professor in the Chemical Engineering Department at Oregon State University. His focus was mass transfer, which was the subject of the textbook he coauthored, Fundamentals of Momentum, Heat, and Mass Transfer.

Early life, education, and career 
Charles was born on July 9, 1925, in Prineville, Oregon, and was raised in Albany, Oregon. He first studied at Willamette University before leaving for the military service. After returning from service, he completed his undergraduate degree in chemical engineering at Oregon State College in 1950 (now Oregon State University). He continued his studies at Carnegie Institute of Technology (now Carnegie Mellon University) in Pittsburgh, Pennsylvania, receiving his Master of Science in 1952 and PhD in 1954.

He then joined the faculty in the Department of Chemical Engineering at Oregon State University. He spent 34 years as a professor and adviser, the last 17 of which he was the department chair until his retirement in 1987.

He was active in AIChE and Chemical Engineers of Oregon, serving as president from 1973 until 1974. He was elected into the Oregon State Engineering Hall of Fame in 1999.

Books 

   Wick was also a coauthor on:  1st ed. (1969), .  2nd ed. (1976), .  3rd ed. (1984), .

Death
Wicks died on July 29, 2010 of natural causes in Corvallis, Oregon. His life was celebrated at Oregon State University in a standing room only event on September 17, 2010.

References

External links
Charles E. Wicks Homepage

1925 births
2010 deaths
People from Albany, Oregon
People from Prineville, Oregon
Willamette University alumni
Oregon State University alumni
Oregon State University faculty